Mariano Piccoli (born 11 September 1970 in Trento) is an Italian former road bicycle racer. Professional between 1992 and 2005, his major victories were 3 individual stages in both Giro d'Italia and Vuelta a España. He also won Points Classification once and Mountains Classification twice in Giro.

Major results

1991
 1st Gran Premio Palio del Recioto
1995
 Giro d'Italia 
1st  Mountains classification  
1st Stage 15 
 Tour of Poland
1st Stage 7 & 9
 1st Stage 4a Euskal Bizikleta
 2nd Overall Giro del Trentino
 7th Tre Valli Varesine
 9th GP Industria & Artigianato di Larciano
1996
 1st  Mountains classification Giro d'Italia 
1997
 1st Gran Premio Industria e Commercio di Prato
 1st Stage 10 Vuelta a España
1998
 Giro d'Italia 
1st  Points classification 
1st Stage 1  
 2nd Overall Rheinland-Pfalz Rundfahrt
1st  Stage 1 
 4th Giro della Provincia di Siracusa
1999
 10th Giro dell'Appennino
2000
 Vuelta a España
1st Stages 12 & 18
 1st Stage 21 Giro d'Italia
 8th Grand Prix of Aargau Canton
2001 
 1st  Points classification Tour de Romandie
 8th Giro della Provincia di Siracusa
2003 
 1st Stage 1b (TTT) Settimana Internazionale di Coppi e Bartali

External links
Profile at ProCyclingStats.com

1970 births
Italian male cyclists
Living people
Sportspeople from Trento
Italian Giro d'Italia stage winners
Italian Vuelta a España stage winners
Cyclists from Trentino-Alto Adige/Südtirol